Anthony William Ryan is a United States banker who was Assistant Secretary of the Treasury for Financial Markets from 2006 to 2008 and Acting Under Secretary of the Treasury for Domestic Finance from 2008 to 2009.

Biography

Anthony Ryan was educated at the University of Rochester, receiving a bachelor's degree in 1985, and the London School of Economics, receiving a master's degree in 1986.

Ryan joined the Boston Company as a manager in 1987.  The next year, he joined PanAgora Asset Management as a manager of Global Investments, working there until 1994.  From 1994 to 2000, he was a principal of State Street Global Advisors.  He was a partner and head of client relations at Grantham, Mayo, Van Otterloo & Co. LLC from 2000 to 2006.

In 2006, Ryan became Assistant Secretary of the Treasury for Financial Markets, holding that office until 2008.  He was Acting Under Secretary of the Treasury for Domestic Finance from 2008 to 2009.

Ryan became the Chief Administrative Officer of Fidelity Investments in 2009.

In 2011, Ryan became the Chief Executive Officer of Arrowstreet Capital, Limited Partnership of Boston, MA.

References

Living people
United States Department of the Treasury officials
United States Assistant Secretaries of the Treasury
George W. Bush administration personnel
University of Rochester alumni
Alumni of the London School of Economics
Year of birth missing (living people)